The Clement House, also known as the Red Cross Building, is a 17,000 sq. ft. mansion located in Buffalo, New York that was built in 1913. The house was designed by architect Edward Brodhead Green of Green & Wicks for the president of Marine National Bank, Stephen Merrell Clement and his wife Carolyn. The building is a contributing property to the Delaware Avenue Historic District designated in 1974.

History

In 1908, Augustus Franklin Tripp died and his daughter, Carolyn Jewett (nee Tripp) Clement, inherited the Tripp residence at 786 Delaware which had been built by Erastus S. Prosser around 1855 and purchased by Tripp in 1881. Carolyn and her husband, banker and industrialist Stephen Merrell Clement, tore down the Tripp residence in 1911 and commissioned Stephen's friend, Edward Brodhead Green to build them a palatial new residence. The fireplace in the drawing room of the Tripp residence was removed and installed in the master bedroom of the new house. Before that, the Clements were living at the home of Stephen's later father at 737 Delaware Avenue. Sadly, Stephen died in Atlantic City, New Jersey on March 26, 1913 before the house was completed later in 1913 at a cost $300,000 to erect.

Their home had 20 rooms, including a music room, a library, a reception room, and a wardrobe room. The family bedrooms were on the second floor and the third floor was the servants' quarters. The entire left side of the house was the Clement's 1,040 square foot music room which featured two Steinway grand pianos, a harp, and a pipe organ.

In 1919, the neighboring residence at 776 Delaware Avenue, a Richardsonian Romanesque mansion known as the Gratwick House, was torn down. Carolyn's father had originally sold a portion of his property to William H. Gratwick who had Henry Hobson Richardson design the house in 1886 as his last commission. The home was constructed in 1888 and completed by Shepley, Rutan and Coolidge, the firm that continued Richardson's practice.

American Red Cross
In 1941, Carolyn donated the house to the Western New York Chapter of the American Red Cross in June 1941. The residence underwent major restoration in 1999. In 2017, The Buffalo Philharmonic Orchestra and the Red Cross announced that local developer and philanthropist John Yurtchuk (co-owner of Calspan) would purchase the property and donate the campus centerpiece, the Clement Residence, to the BPO as a gift to the orchestra. After the sale, the residence would house the administrative staff of both the Red Cross and Buffalo Philharmonic Orchestra "with the Red Cross occupying a portion of the first floor and the entire third floor while the BPO staff will occupy the second floor. The foyer and conference rooms on the main floor will be shared by the two organizations."

In 1979, an office building and an adjoining structure connected by an atrium were built on the back portion of the four acre plot near the carriage house and another parking lot. In 2018, BestSelf Behavioral Health, a nonprofit agency, paid $3.15 million to buy the 53,500-square-foot complex on 2.85 acres behind the Clement Mansion.

See also
 Delaware Avenue Historic District (Buffalo, New York)
 Architecture of Buffalo, New York
 Gothic Revival architecture in New York

References
Notes

Sources

External links

Carolyn Tripp Clement House / Red Cross Building at Buffalo Architecture and History

Historic district contributing properties in Erie County, New York
Houses completed in 1914
Culture of Buffalo, New York
Buildings and structures in Buffalo, New York
Houses in Buffalo, New York
Architecture of Buffalo, New York
Green & Wicks buildings